The Primetime Emmy Award for Outstanding Lead Actress in a Limited or Anthology Series or Movie is an award presented annually by the Academy of Television Arts & Sciences (ATAS). It is given in honor of an actress who has delivered an outstanding performance in a leading role on a television limited series or television movie for the primetime network season.

The award was first presented at the 7th Primetime Emmy Awards on March 7, 1955, to Judith Anderson, for her performance as Lady Macbeth on the Hallmark Hall of Fame episode "Macbeth". It has undergone several name changes, with the category split into two categories at the 25th Primetime Emmy Awards: Outstanding Lead Actress in a Special Program – Drama or Comedy; and Outstanding Lead Actress in a Limited Series. By the 31st Primetime Emmy Awards, the categories were merged into one, and it has since undergone several name changes, leading to its current title.

Since its inception, the award has been given to 54 actresses. Amanda Seyfried is the current recipient of the award, for her portrayal of Elizabeth Holmes on The Dropout. Helen Mirren has won the most awards in this category, with four, and has received the most nominations for the award, on ten occasions.

Winners and nominations

1950s

1960s

1970s

1980s

1990s

2000s

2010s

2020s

Superlatives

Programs with multiple wins

5 wins
 Hallmark Hall of Fame

2 wins
 Bob Hope Presents the Chrysler Theatre
 Prime Suspect
 Producers' Showcase

Performers with multiple wins

4 wins
 Helen Mirren (2 consecutive)

3 wins
 Patty Duke
 Laura Linney

2 wins
 Judith Anderson
 Ingrid Bergman
 Julie Harris
 Holly Hunter
 Regina King
 Jessica Lange
 Geraldine Page
 Gena Rowlands
 Meryl Streep
 Kate Winslet
 Joanne Woodward

Programs with multiple nominations

9 nominations
 Hallmark Hall of Fame

6 nominations
 American Horror Story
 Prime Suspect

5 nominations
 Playhouse 90

4 nominations
 American Crime

3 nominations
 Bob Hope Presents the Chrysler Theatre
 The United States Steel Hour

2 nominations
 American Crime Story
 Angels in America
 Big Little Lies
 Captains and the Kings
 CBS Playhouse
 Climax!
 A Cooler Climate
 Dr. Kildare*
 Elizabeth R
 Fargo
 Feud
 Grey Gardens
 Holocaust
 Lonesome Dove 
 Lux Video Theater
 The Miracle Worker
 Norma Jean & Marilyn
 The Richard Boone Show
 Roe vs. Wade
 The Snoop Sisters
 Studio One
 Sybil
 When They See Us
 Wild Iris

Performers with multiple nominations

10 nominations
 Helen Mirren

7 nominations
 Judy Davis
 Jessica Lange

6 nominations
 Glenn Close
 Julie Harris
 Gena Rowlands
 Joanne Woodward

5 nominations
 Helen Hayes
 Lee Remick

4 nominations
 Jane Alexander
 Judith Anderson
 Ann-Margret
 Katharine Hepburn
 Holly Hunter
 Elizabeth Montgomery
 Sarah Paulson
 Eva Marie Saint
 Maureen Stapleton
 Emma Thompson
 Cicely Tyson
 Alfre Woodard

3 nominations
 Ingrid Bergman
 Judi Dench
 Colleen Dewhurst
 Patty Duke
 Sally Field
 Lee Grant
 Felicity Huffman
 Glenda Jackson
 Laura Linney
 Mary Tyler Moore
 Geraldine Page
 Vanessa Redgrave
 Maggie Smith
 Meryl Streep
 Jessica Tandy
 Sigourney Weaver

2 nominations
 Halle Berry
 Helena Bonham Carter
 Carol Burnett
 Ellen Burstyn
 Stockard Channing
 Susan Clark
 Laura Dern
 Blythe Danner
 Bette Davis
 Farrah Fawcett
 Lynn Fontanne
 Rosemary Harris
 Barbara Hershey
 Anjelica Huston
 Ann Jillian
 Ashley Judd
 Nicole Kidman
 Regina King
 Diane Lane
 Piper Laurie
 Cloris Leachman
 Jean Marsh
 Suzanne Pleshette
 Queen Latifah
 Susan Sarandon
 Jane Seymour
 Sada Thompson
 Claire Trevor
 Kerry Washington
 JoBeth Williams
 Kate Winslet
 Shelley Winters
 Teresa Wright

See also
 TCA Award for Individual Achievement in Drama
 Golden Globe Award for Best Actress – Miniseries or Television Film
 Critics' Choice Television Award for Best Actress in a Movie/Miniseries
 Screen Actors Guild Award for Outstanding Performance by a Female Actor in a Miniseries or Television Movie

References

Lead Actress - Miniseries or Movie
 
Emmy Award